The Republic of China competed as Chinese Taipei at the 1988 Summer Olympics in Seoul, South Korea. 61 competitors, including 43 men and 18 women, took part in 84 events in 13 sports.

Competitors
The following is the list of number of competitors in the Games.

Archery

Chinese Taipei entered three men and three women in the archery competition.  The women fared much better than the men in the individual competition, but the men's team was able to advance to the final whereas the women were eliminated in the semifinal.

Women's Individual Competition:
 Lai Fang-Mei – Semifinal (→ 12th place)
 Liu Pi-Yu – Quarterfinal (→ 15th place)
 Chin Chiu-Yueh – Preliminary Round (→ 27th place)

Men's Individual Competition:
 Hu Pei-Wen – Preliminary Round (→ 31st place)
 Yen Man-Sung – Preliminary Round (→ 42nd place)
 Chiu Ping-Kun – Preliminary Round (→ 45th place)

Women's Team Competition:
 Lai, Liu, and Chin – Semifinal (→ 11th place)

Men's Team Competition:
 Hu, Yen, and Chiu – Final (→ 7th place)

Athletics

Men's Long Jump 
 Nai Hui-Fang 
 Qualification — 7.45m (→ did not advance)

Men's Decathlon 
 Lee Fu-an — 7517 points (→ 25th place) 
 100 metres — 11.00s
 Long Jump — 7.23m
 Shot Put — 13.15m
 High Jump — 2.03m
 400 metres — 49.73s
 110m Hurdles — 14.96s
 Discus Throw — 38.06m
 Pole Vault — 4.50m
 Javelin Throw — 52.82m
 1.500 metres — 4:45.57s

Women's 4 × 100 m Relay 
 Chang Fen-Hwa, Chen Wen-Ing, Chen Ya-Li, and Wang Shu-Hwa 
 Heat — 46.21 (→ did not advance)

Women's Heptathlon 
 Hsu Hui-Ing
 Final Result — 5290 points (→ 23rd place)

Boxing

Men's Light Flyweight (– 48 kg)
 Liu Hsin-Hung
 First Round — Bye
 Second Round — Lost to Thomas Chisenga (Zambia), 1:4

Cycling

Three cyclists, two men and one woman, represented Chinese Taipei in 1988.

Men's road race
 Hsu Jui-te

Men's sprint
 Lee Fu-hsiang

Men's 1 km time trial
 Lee Fu-hsiang

Men's points race
 Hsu Jui-te

Women's road race
 Yang Hsiu-chen

Women's sprint
 Yang Hsiu-chen

Fencing

Two fencers, both men, represented Chinese Taipei in 1988.

Men's foil
 Wang San-Tsai
 Yan Wing-Shean

Men's épée
 Wang San-Tsai

Men's sabre
 Yan Wing-Shean

Gymnastics

Judo

Modern pentathlon

Two male pentathletes represented Chinese Taipei in 1988.

Men's Individual Competition:
 Li King-Ho — 4682pts (→ 44th place)
 Chuang Tang-Fa —  4435pts (→ 54th place)

Men's Team Competition:
 Li, and Chuang — 9117pts (→ 20th place)

Shooting

Swimming

Men's 50 m Freestyle
 Chiang Chi-Li
 Heat – 25.26 (→ did not advance, 51st place)

Men's 100 m Freestyle
 Chiang Chi-Li
 Heat – 55.87 (→ did not advance, 63rd place)

Men's 200 m Freestyle
 Wu Ming-Hsun
 Heat – 2:00.43 (→ did not advance, 55th place)

Men's 400 m Freestyle
 Wu Ming-Hsun
 Heat – 4:06.66 (→ did not advance, 40th place)

Men's 1500 m Freestyle
 Wu Ming-Hsun
 Heat – 15:59.74 (→ did not advance, 33rd place)

Men's 100 m Breaststroke
 Tsai Hsin-Yen
 Heat – 1:04.58 (→ did not advance, 24th place)

Men's 200 m Breaststroke
 Tsai Hsin-Yen
 Heat – 2:23.80 (→ did not advance, 33rd place)

Men's 200 m Individual Medley
 Tsai Hsin-Yen
 Heat – 2:17.95 (→ did not advance, 49th place)
 Chiang Chi-li
 Heat – 2:18.76 (→ did not advance, 51st place)

Women's 50 m Freestyle
 Wang Chi
 Heat – 28.73 (→ did not advance, 41st place)
 Sabrina Lum
 Heat – 28.82 (→ did not advance, 42nd place)

Women's 100 m Freestyle
 Wang Chi
 Heat – 1:01.72 (→ did not advance, 46th place)
 Sabrina Lum
 Heat – 1:02.11 (→ did not advance, 48th place)

Women's 200 m Freestyle
 Chang Hui-Chien
 Heat – 2:11.50 (→ did not advance, 38th place)

Women's 100 m Backstroke
 Wang Chi
 Heat – 1:09.56 (→ did not advance, 32nd place)

Women's 200 m Backstroke
 Wang Chi
 Heat – 2:36.60 (→ did not advance, 31st place)

Women's 100 m Breaststroke
 Carwai Seto
 Heat – 1:15.47 (→ did not advance, 32nd place)
 Chen Yu-Fang
 Heat – 1:20.95 (→ did not advance, 39th place)

Women's 200 m Breaststroke
 Carwai Seto
 Heat – 2:42.31 (→ did not advance, 35th place)
 Chen Yu-Fang
 Heat – 2:50.84 (→ did not advance, 41st place)

Women's 100 m Butterfly
 Chang Hui-Chien
 Heat – 1:07.36 (→ did not advance, 32nd place)

Women's 200 m Butterfly
 Chang Hui-Chien
 Heat – 2:25.50 (→ did not advance, 25th  place)

Women's 200 m Individual Medley
 Carwai Seto
 Heat – 2:27.72 (→ did not advance, 28th place)
 Chen Yu-Fang
 Heat – 2:35.11 (→ did not advance, 33rd place)

Women's 400 m Individual Medley
 Chang Hui-Chien
 Heat – 5:13.20 (→ did not advance, 27th place)
 Chen Yu-Fang
 Heat – 5:28.15 (→ did not advance, 30th place)

Women's 4 × 100 m Freestyle Relay
 Wang Chi, Sabrina Lum, Carwai Seto, and Chang Hui-Chien
 Heat – 4:09.84 (→ did not advance, 15th place)

Women's 4 × 100 m Medley Relay
 Wang Chi, Carwai Seto, Chang Hui-Chien, and Chen Yu-Fang
 Heat – 4:39.49 (→ did not advance, 16th place)

Table tennis

Weightlifting

Wrestling

References

External links
Official Olympic Reports

Nations at the 1988 Summer Olympics
1988
1988 in Taiwanese sport